Bartosz Bednorz (born 25 July 1994) is a Polish professional volleyball player. He is a member of the Poland national team, and a participant in the Olympic Games Rio 2016. At the professional club level, he plays for ZAKSA Kędzierzyn-Koźle.

Career

Clubs
In 2014, Bednorz signed a contract with Indykpol AZS Olsztyn, and the next year, he extended his contract for a one more season. In April 2016, PGE Skra Bełchatów, announced that Bednorz is going to play for Skra in the next PlusLiga season. He signed a two–year contract until 2018.

National team
On 2 April 2015, he was called up to the Poland national team by the head coach Stéphane Antiga. He was a member of the national team during the intercontinental round of the 2015 World League. On 14 August 2015, he achieved his first medal as a national team player – bronze of the European League. His national team won the 3rd place match with Estonia (3–0).

Honours

Clubs
 National championships
 2017/2018  Polish SuperCup, with PGE Skra Bełchatów
 2017/2018  Polish Championship, with PGE Skra Bełchatów
 2018/2019  Italian SuperCup, with Azimut Modena
 2020/2021  Russian SuperCup, with Zenit Kazan
 2021/2022  Russian Cup, with Zenit Kazan
 2022/2023  Polish Cup, with ZAKSA Kędzierzyn-Koźle

Individual awards
 2017: Polish SuperCup – Most Valuable Player
 2019: FIVB Nations League – Best Outside Spiker

References

External links

 
 Player profile at LegaVolley.it 
 Player profile at PlusLiga.pl  
 Player profile at Volleybox.net 
 
 

1994 births
Living people
Sportspeople from Zabrze
Polish men's volleyball players
Olympic volleyball players of Poland
Volleyball players at the 2016 Summer Olympics
Polish expatriate sportspeople in Italy
Expatriate volleyball players in Italy
Polish expatriate sportspeople in Russia
Expatriate volleyball players in Russia
Polish expatriate sportspeople in China
Expatriate volleyball players in China
AZS Częstochowa players
AZS Olsztyn players
Skra Bełchatów players
Modena Volley players
VC Zenit Kazan players
ZAKSA Kędzierzyn-Koźle players
Outside hitters